Maryville is an inner suburb of Newcastle, New South Wales, Australia, located  northwest of Newcastle's central business district.

Origin
Maryville is a Harbourside suburb of Newcastle, surrounded by the Throsby Creek system. It is situated by the boundary of Throsby Creek, by Islington Park to the south and Wickham to the East. Maryville was named after Mary Hannell, and previously known as Smedmore.

Today
Maryville today is a quiet, leafy and trendy inner city suburb. Due to this, a large influx of professional workers seeking close proximity to the water, local beaches and city now call Maryville home. Locally, the Throsby Waters Cycleway, Islington Park, cafes, and harbour provide many locals with a lifestyle which is becoming increasing in demand. Close to nearby s

Real Estate
In past times, Maryville was considered an industrial suburb where much of Newcastle's working class resided in the smaller miners cottages. However, in recent years, Maryville has become one of Newcastle's most expensive suburbs, breaking the $1 million barrier in November 2021.

Gentrifying quite significantly, many of the older dwellings are becoming developed and sold for increasing profits. In 2019, 84 Estell Street sold for $1.6M. In 2021, 76 Estell Street & 24 Northumberland Street sold for $1.4M & $1.413M respectively.

References

Suburbs of Newcastle, New South Wales